Bridger Aerospace is an American aerospace company which provides aerial firefighting and wildfire management services.  At the Martin Fire in Nevada in 2018, it was the first private company to legally fly a drone over a wildfire.

History 
The company was founded in 2014 by Tim Sheehy, a former Navy SEAL who utilized airborne surveillance during the Global War on Terror and desired to apply that same capability to public safety tasks. Initially, Sheehy operated one plane to assist ranchers with tracking their cattle from the air. Starting in the  2015 wildfire season, he shifted the company's focus to aerial firefighting.

In 2018, Bridger was one of four companies awarded a contract with the United States Department of the Interior to use drones in emergency situations, including wildfires.  Under the contract, the company was granted permission to fly a drone over a wildfire. It became the first private company to legally do so when it used its drones to fly over wildfires during the Martin Fire in Nevada, mapping 435,000 acres of burned land in 11 flight runs. 

By August 2019 the company had grown to a fleet of 20 aircraft and a staff of 100.

In March 2020, Bridger Aerospace offered its fleet to healthcare workers for moving supplies and patients as a response to the global COVID-19 pandemic. The company also  manufactured face shields that it donated to frontline workers and used its fleet to deliver PPE to medical personnel in Montana.

Bridger was the launch customer for the De Havilland CL-415EAF Firefighting Aircraft.

In January of 2023, Bridger went public via SPAC Merger at a valuation of $869mm. It currently trades under NASDAQ: BAER

Operations
The company is headquartered in Belgrade, Montana, and provides its aerial fire fighting services to government agencies including the United States Forest Service in states across the U.S. Its planes are used for fire suppression and it uses unmanned aerial vehicles to map and provide surveillance of fires. The drones provide fire crews with information including infrared imagery of active fires, and help communicating with and tracking firefighters on the ground.

Fleet
As of 2021, the company's fleet includes over 20 aircraft, including:

References

External links 

Wildfire prevention
Aerospace companies of the United States
Companies based in Montana
Aerial firefighting
Belgrade, Montana